Plants and Birds and Rocks and Things was the 1993 debut album by The Loud Family, a band formed by singer, songwriter and guitarist Scott Miller after the dissolution of his 1980s band Game Theory. It was Miller's fifth album to be produced by Mitch Easter.

Background
Having dissolved his 1980s band Game Theory, Scott Miller reemerged in 1993 with his new band, The Loud Family. Plants and Birds and Rocks and Things took its name from a line from the song "A Horse with No Name" by America.

Critical reception
 In a 1996 book, Rolling Stone′s Scott Schinder wrote that Scott Miller's "off-center genius didn't skip a beat as he transferred his unique perspective to his new group, whose musical muscularity gave his hook-intensive tunes the sonic clout to make them knockouts."

Rolling Stone′s 1993 review, by rock critic J.D. Considine, stated that "Miller puts his emphasis not on the words but on the melodies, and that pays off big time with songs like 'Sword Swallower,' the power-poppy 'Isaac's Law' and the driving, guitar-crazed 'Jimmy Still Comes Around.'" Compared to Game Theory's work, the lyrics remained "obsessed with arcana," but Considine concluded that "when his songs boast choruses as catchy as the one in 'Take Me Down (Too Halloo),' odds are that you won't really care what the lyrics mean."

According to Spin, "Sonically, the Loud Family offers a more guitar-heavy approach than Game Theory did, but Miller's songs and voice are immediately identifiable. Interpersonal relationships are discussed in sweet, brusque terms." Spin reviewer Byron Coley cited "the power of the sweet science that exists in Miller's songs," despite "interspersed jangle and woof."

Wired said, "Before somebody inevitably describes The Loud Family as 'clever pop' and you go off sneering, be advised that this is the new musical phoenix risen whole and rocking from the ashes of the late great Game Theory." Citing imagery "lifted from a decade's worth of old books, TV shows, and rock songs, plus patented Scott Miller tongue-in-tweek lyrics (priceless song title: 'Ballad of How You Can All Shut Up')", Wired called the band "the aftermath of a high-speed collision between several solid pop bands and the cast of Firesign Theatre."

In the 2002 book All Music Guide to Rock: The Definitive Guide to Rock, Pop, and Soul, reviewer Mark Deming wrote that "Miller's uncanny way with a hook remains unsurpassed" in this album, even as his "eccentricities" took "center stage alongside his ... uniquely melodic pop songs." Comparing this album to Miller's self-described "young-adult-hurt-feeling-athons" on early Game Theory albums, Deming wrote that "here hurt gets co-star billing with rage, anger, paranoia, and self-destructive angst; thematically, Plants and Birds and Rocks and Things slips into a lyrical darkness far deeper than Game Theory at its moodiest, making this pure pop for those who have a good time being unhappy."

Track listing
"He Do The Police in Different Voices" – 2:30
"Sword Swallower" – 1:44
"Aerodeliria" – 3:00
"Self Righteous Boy Reduced to Tears" – 1:06
"Jimmy Still Comes Around" – 4:19
"Take Me Down (Too Halloo)" – 3:11
"Don't All Thank Me At Once" – 1:26
"Idiot Son" – 2:40
"Some Grand Vision of Motives and Irony" – 2:44
"Spot the Setup" – 2:12
"Inverness" – 4:11
"Rosy Overdrive" - 6:04
"Slit My Wrists" - 2:48
"Isaac's Law" - 3:50
"The Second Grade Applauds" - 2:45
"Last Honest Face" - 4:43
"Even You" - 3:35
"Ballad of How You Can All Shut Up" - 1:21
"Give in World" - 3:15

Personnel
Jozef Becker - drums and percussion
Scott Miller - vocals and rhythm guitar
R. Dunbar Poor - bass guitar
Zachary Smith - lead guitar
Paul Wieneke - keyboards and backing vocals

Also credited:
 Don Tillman - ARP 2600 on "The Second Grade Applauds All Day"
 Gil Ray - recorder on "Inverness" and temple blocks on "Idiot Son"
 Mitch Easter - backing vocals on "He Do The Police in Different Voices" and tambourine on "Last Honest Face" and "Give in World"
 Shalini Chatterjee - backing vocals on "Ballad of How You Can All Shut Up", bass guitar on "Don't All Thank Me At Once", and Screaming Mouth on album cover
 Joaquin Maguire - fence

References

External links

1993 debut albums
The Loud Family albums
Albums produced by Mitch Easter
Alias Records albums
Jangle pop albums